ISO 3166-2:IE is the entry for Ireland in ISO 3166-2, part of the ISO 3166 standard published by the International Organization for Standardization (ISO), which defines codes for the names of the principal subdivisions (e.g., provinces or states) of all countries coded in ISO 3166-1.

Currently for Ireland, ISO 3166-2 codes are defined for two levels of subdivisions:
 4 provinces
 26 counties

The 26 counties are traditional counties, which are different from the first-level administrative subdivisions of Ireland.

Each code consists of two parts, separated by a hyphen. The second part is one or two letters. For the counties, the letters are generally the same as those currently used in vehicle registration plates, with the following exceptions:
 County Cork vehicles rather than  use ; in ISO 3166-2 the latter is used for the province of Connacht.
 three counties where there were multiple councils and vehicle codes until the Local Government Reform Act 2014:
 County Limerick vehicles rather than  now use , which had been restricted to the city of Limerick before 2014 
 County Waterford vehicles rather than  now use , which had been restricted to the city of Waterford before 2014 
 County Tipperary vehicles rather than  use  . Before 2014 North Tipperary and South Tipperary used  and  respectively.

Current codes
Subdivision names are listed as in the ISO 3166-2 standard published by the ISO 3166 Maintenance Agency (ISO 3166/MA).

ISO 639-1 codes are used to represent subdivision names in the following administrative languages:
 (en): English
 (ga): Irish

Click on the button in the header to sort each column.

Provinces

Counties

Changes
The following changes to the entry have been announced in newsletters by the ISO 3166/MA since the first publication of ISO 3166-2 in 1998:

See also
 Subdivisions of Ireland
 FIPS region codes of Ireland
 NUTS codes of Ireland

External links
 ISO Online Browsing Platform: IE
 Counties of Ireland, Statoids.com

2:IE
 ISO 3166-2
 ISO 3166-2
Republic of Ireland geography-related lists